Ƿēodmōnaþ (modern English: Weed (or Grass) Month) was the Anglo-Saxon name for the month of August.

The name was recorded by the Anglo-Saxon scholar Bede in his treatise De temporum ratione (The Reckoning of  Time), saying that "Vueod-Monath is the month of weeds, as this is the time when they grow most abundantly”

Ƿēodmōnaþ is also explained in Menologium of the Anglo-Saxon Chronicles:

“Agustus mōnaþ on ūre geþeōde ƿē nemnaþ Ƿeōdmōnaþ, for ðon ðe hī on ðam mōnþe mǣst geƿeaxaþ.”

"The month of Agustus we call the weed month in our language, for these grow most in this month.”

See also

Germanic calendar
Anglo-Saxon
Old English

References

August
Old English